Eadon is a surname and male given name. Notable people with this name include:

 John Eadon (1889–1961), Scottish football player
 Robert Eadon Leader (1839–1922), English journalist and historian
 Wilfred Eadon (1915–1999), English cricket player

See also
 Eadon Green Black Cuillin
 Eadon Green Zeclat